Bouchercon is an annual convention of creators and devotees of mystery and detective fiction. It is named in honour of writer, reviewer, and editor Anthony Boucher; also the inspiration for the Anthony Awards, which have been issued at the convention since 1986. This page details Bouchercon XXXII and the 16th Anthony Awards ceremony.

Bouchercon
The convention was held in Washington, DC on November 1, 2001; running until the 4th. The event was chaired by vice president of "science and policy" at the National Alliance for Hispanic Health Adolph P. Falcón; and William L. Starck, of NACO, the Library of Congress authority control co-operative.

Special Guests
Lifetime Achievement award — Edward D. Hoch
American Guest of Honor — Sue Grafton
International Guest of Honor — Peter Lovesey
Fan Guests of Honor — Lew Buckingham & Nancy Buckingham
Toastmaster — Michael Connelly

Anthony Awards
The following list details the awards distributed at the sixteenth annual Anthony Awards ceremony.

Novel award
Winner:
Val McDermid, A Place of Execution

Shortlist:
Nevada Barr, Deep South
Joe R. Lansdale, The Bottoms
Marcia Muller, Listen to the Silence
Elizabeth Peters, He Shall Thunder in the Sky
Charles Todd, Legacy of the Dead

First novel award
Winner:
Qiu Xiaolong, Death of a Red Heroine

Shortlist:
Stephen Booth, Black Dog
David Liss, A Conspiracy of Paper
Scott Phillips, The Ice Harvest
Bob Truluck, Street Level
Douglas E. Winter, Run

Paperback original award
Winner:
Kate Grilley, Death Dances to a Reggae Beat

Shortlist:
Katy Munger, Bad to the Bone
Daniel Stashower, The Floating Lady Murder
Chassie L. West, Killing Kin
Laura Wilson, A Little Death
Eric Wright, The Kidnapping of Rosie Dawn

Short story award
Winner:
Edward D. Hoch, "The Problem of the Potting Shed", from Ellery Queen's Mystery Magazine July 2000

Shortlist:
Rhys Bowen, "The Seal of the Confessional", from Unholy Orders: Mystery Stories with a Religious Twist
Rochelle Krich, "Widow's Peak", from Unholy Orders: Mystery Stories with a Religious Twist
Donald Olson, "Don't Go Upstairs", from Ellery Queen's Mystery Magazine August 2000
Peter Robinson, "Missing in Action", from Ellery Queen's Mystery Magazine November 2000

Critical / Non-fiction award
Winner:
Jim Huang, 100 Favorite Mysteries of the Century

Shortlist:
Matthew Bunson, The Complete Christie: An Agatha Christie Encyclopedia
Martha Hailey DuBose, Women of Mystery: The Lives and Works of Notable Women Crime Novelists
Marvin Lachman, The American Regional Mystery
Erin A. Smith, Hard-Boiled: Working Class Readers and Pulp Magazines

Short story collection / anthology award
Winner:
Lawrence Block, Master's Choice II

Shortlist:
Joan Hess, Malice Domestic 9
Jeffrey Marks, Magnolias and Mayhem
Serita Stevens, Unholy Orders
Carolyn Wheat, Tales out of School

Fan publication award
Winner:
Chris Aldrich & Lynn Kaczmarek, Mystery News

Shortlist:
George Easter, Deadly Pleasures
Jim Huang, The Drood Review of Mystery
Sue Feder, Murder: Past Tense
Janet Rudolph, Mystery Readers Journal

References

Anthony Awards
32
2001 in Washington, D.C.